John Y. Cole (born July 30, 1940) is an American librarian, historian, and author. He was the founding director of the Center for the Book at the Library of Congress and in 2016 became the first official historian of the Library of Congress.

Education and career

John Young Cole was born in Ellensburg, Washington, July 30, 1940. He graduated from the University of Washington in Seattle in 1962, going on to earn a Master of Library Science degree from the University of Washington School of Librarianship the following year. He later earned a Master of Arts in Liberal Studies from Johns Hopkins University in 1966 and a Ph.D. from George Washington University in American civilization in 1971.

From 1946 to 1966, Cole was chief of the library branch of the U.S. Army Intelligence School, stocking the library's collection on foreign intelligence from books in the Library of Congress surplus books program.

Cole was hired at the Library of Congress in 1966 as an administrative assistant. He also worked in the Library's Congressional Research Service and in the Reference Department as a collection development librarian. He researched and wrote articles on the history of the library, focusing his Ph. D. dissertation on Ainsworth Rand Spofford, the nineteenth century Librarian of Congress who expanded the library from a small reference collection to a national institution. Cole's knowledge about the history of the organization led to his role on a yearlong planning task force initiated by Library of Congress Daniel Boorstin. Boorstin recommended Cole to lead the new Center for the Book, created in 1977 to use the resources of the Library of Congress to promote literacy and reading.

Cole served as the executive director for the Center of the Book from 1977 to 2016. Under his leadership, the Center began the popular National Book Festival, opened the Young Readers Center to encourage reading by young people, and created the Library of Congress Literacy Awards, providing recognition and financial prizes for organizations that promote increased literacy.

In 2016, Cole was named the first Historian of the Library of Congress. The position is dedicated to research and documentation of the history of the Library of Congress.

He has received a variety of awards, notably the first "Champion for Literacy" award, presented by the Barbara Bush Foundation for Family Literacy in 2016, and the 2000 Joseph Wharton Lippincott Award, presented by the American Library Association for distinguished service to librarianship. The Lippincott Award statement praised Cole for having "exposed the American people to the power of the written word through dozens of national reading and library promotion projects including the landmark Read More About It series on CBS Television."

Since 2003 Cole and his wife, Director of the Smithsonian Libraries Nancy E. Gwinn, have maintained endowments to support the internships of library and information science students at the Smithsonian Libraries and at the University of Michigan School of Information. They also fund an endowment for supporting the operations of the technical services of the University of Wyoming Libraries.

Selected bibliography

References

External links

Interview with John Y. Cole about Year of the Young Reader, All About Kids! TV Series #20 (1989)

Living people
1940 births
American librarians
American historians
University of Washington Information School alumni
Johns Hopkins University alumni
George Washington University alumni
Librarians at the Library of Congress